In geometry, the pentagonal orthocupolarotunda is one of the Johnson solids .  As the name suggests, it can be constructed by joining a pentagonal cupola and a pentagonal rotunda along their decagonal bases, matching the pentagonal faces. A 36-degree rotation of one of the halves before the joining yields a pentagonal gyrocupolarotunda.

Formulae
The following formulae for volume and surface area can be used if all faces are regular, with edge length a:

References

External links
 

Johnson solids